The Cyprus spiny mouse (Acomys nesiotes) is a little-known rodent endemic to Cyprus. These nocturnal animals are generally found in arid areas. After the last reliable record in 1980 no considerable effort has been made until 2007 when four individuals were rediscovered. Due to the insufficient data of its population the IUCN considers it as data deficient.

See also
 List of extinct animals
 List of extinct animals of Europe

References

 Nowak, R.M. (ed.) 1999. Walkers Mammals of the World. Sixth edition. The Johns Hopkins University Press, Baltimore and London.
 Wilson, D.E. and Reeder, D.M. (eds) 1993. Mammal Species of the World: a taxonomic and geographic reference. Second edition. Smithsonian Institution Press, Washington and London.

External links
Cyprus Spiny Mouse rediscovered 
 The Extinction Website

Acomys
Rodents of Europe
Endemic fauna of Cyprus
Mammals described in 1903
Taxa named by Dorothea Bate